Khijadia or variants may refer to the following places in Gujarat, India:

 Khijadiya, Amreli, a village
 Khijadia State, a town and former independent princely state
 Khijadiya Bird Sanctuary, in Jamnagar district

See also 
 Khijadia Dosaji, a village and former non-salute Rajput princely state
 Khijadia Najani, a village and former non-salute princely state